Beatrice "Beppie" Noyes (July 20, 1919 – July 3, 2007) was an American author and illustrator.

Biography
Born as Beatrice Spencer, she graduated from Vassar College with a degree in theater. After a short lived marriage to William Baldwin, she married war correspondent Newbold Noyes, Jr. They settled in Potomac near Washington where she co-founded the Potomac Almanac, while her husband became the editor of the Washington Evening Star.

In 1978, she wrote her first book Mosby, the Kennedy Center Cat about the cat in the Kennedy Center featuring her own illustrations. Wigglesworth: The Caterpillar Who Wanted to Fly followed in 1985. 

The Noyes settled in the Frenchman Bay area of Maine where Noyes wrote extensively for the Frenchman's Bay Conservancy. These works were published as Beppie's Musings featuring many of her drawings.  She died in Sorrento, Maine, on July 3, 2007, aged 87.

References

1919 births
2007 deaths
American children's writers
American women illustrators
American illustrators
Noyes family
Writers from Detroit
People from Hancock County, Maine
Vassar College alumni